The R117 road is a regional road in Ireland. The route (north-south) starts Harcourt Road at the end of the South Circular Road on the southside of Dublin city centre. It crosses the Grand Canal and goes through the suburbs of Ranelagh, Milltown, Windy Arbour, Dundrum, Sandyford, Stepaside and Kilternan (where it crosses the R116) before passing through the Scalp into County Wicklow. 

In Wicklow it goes through Enniskerry where it veers east to the N11 at Fassaroe just west of Bray, this part of the road is colloquially known as "The 21 Bends".

The official description of the R117 from the Roads Act 1993 (Classification of Regional Roads) Order 2012  reads:

R117: Dublin - Enniskerry - Kilcroney, County Wicklow

Between its junction with R114 at Harcourt Road in the city of Dublin and it junction with N11 at Kilcroney in the county of Wicklow via Charlemont Street, Ranelagh Road, Ranelagh, Sandford Road and Milltown Road in the city of Dublin: Dundrum Road; Dundrum Bypass, Sandyford Road, Ballally, Stepaside, Golden Ball, Kiltiernan, Glenamuck South and Enniskerry Road in the county of DunLaoghaire — Rathdown: The Scalp at the boundary between the county of DunLaoghaire — Rathdown and the county of Wicklow: Killegar, Knocksink, Enniskerry and Cookstown in the county of Wicklow.

Transport
Most of the route is covered by the 44 bus operated by Dublin Bus. The bus route does not use the Dundrum bypass, instead running through the village, and also terminates at Enniskerry village and not at the N11.

See also
Roads in Ireland
National primary road
National secondary road
Regional road

References

Regional roads in the Republic of Ireland
Roads in County Dublin
Roads in County Wicklow